Ayelén Martínez (born 1993) is an Argentine chess player.

She participated in the Women's World Chess Championship 2017, where she lost to Zhao Xue.

External links 

Living people
Argentine female chess players
1993 births
Place of birth missing (living people)